The 2008 Macau Open Grand Prix Gold was a badminton tournament which took place at the Tap Seac Multi-sports Pavilion, Macau on 30 September to 5 October 2008 and had a total purse of $120,000.

Men's singles

Seeds

 Lee Chong Wei (final)
 Bao Chunlai (withdrew)
 Chen Jin (withdrew)
 Taufik Hidayat (champion)
 Simon Santoso (withdrew)
 Wong Choong Hann (quarterfinals)
 Andrew Smith (third round)
 Chan Yan Kit (quarterfinals)
 Ng Wei (third round)
 Nguyễn Tiến Minh (third round)
 Kendrick Lee (second round)
 Muhammad Hafiz Hashim (withdrew)
 Eric Pang (first round)
 Tanongsak Saensomboonsuk (third round)
 Chen Hong (quarterfinals)
 Chong Wei Feng (third round)

Finals

Women's singles

Seeds

 Wong Mew Choo (second round)
 Wang Chen (withdrew)
 Zhou Mi (champion)
 Yip Pui Yin (semifinals)
 Maria Kristin Yulianti (withdrew)
 Yao Jie (second round)
 Jiang Yanjiao (withdrew)
 Julia Wong Pei Xian (final)

Finals

Men's doubles

Seeds

  Koo Kien Keat / Tan Boon Heong (champion)
  Fang Chieh-min / Lee Sheng-mu (final)
  Chan Chong Ming / Chew Choon Eng (semifinals)
  Fernando Kurniawan / Lingga Lie (semifinals)
  He Hanbin / Shen Ye (second round)
  Sun Junjie / Xu Chen (quarterfinals)
  Hendra Wijaya / Yoga Ukikasah (withdrew)
  Lo Lok Kei / Albertus Susanto Njoto (first round)

Finals

Women's doubles

Seeds

  Fong Chew Yen / Mooi Hing Yau (quarterfinals)
  Shinta Mulia Sari / Yao Lei (quarterfinals)
  Nicole Grether /  Charmaine Reid (quarterfinals)
  Mong Kwan Yi / Ng Ka Shun (second round)

Finals

Mixed doubles

Seeds

 Yohan Hadikusumo Wiratama / Chau Hoi Wah (final)
 Tontowi Ahmad / Yulianti (second round)
 Chan Peng Soon / Amelia Alicia Anscelly (second round)
 Wang Chia-min / Wang Pei-rong (semifinals)
 Lo Lok Kei / Ng Ka Shun (first round)
 Anggun Nugroho / Lita Nurlita (withdrew)
 Leung Chun Yiu / Mong Kwan Yi (first round)
 Lim Khim Wah / Woon Khe Wei (quarterfinals)
 Chayut Triyachart / Yao Lei (quarterfinals)
 Fang Chieh-min / Liu Shu-chih (first round)

Finals

References

External links
 Tournament Link

Macau Open Badminton Championships
Macau Open
Macau Open